Barbara Jayne Jensen (later Reeve, later Jackson, September 15, 1929 – December 20, 2018) was an American competition swimmer who represented the United States at the 1948 Summer Olympics in London.  She competed in the semifinals of the 100-meter backstroke and finished fifth with a time of 1:19.1.

Jensen learned to swim at the Jewish Community Center in San Francisco and started competing around the age of 12. She then trained at the Athens Athletic Club in Oakland, and returned to San Francisco in 1949. In 1945, aged 15, she broke the national record in the 100 m backstroke. Jensen was a member of the national team in 1949–50. In 1949 she won the AAU titles in the 110 yd and 220 yd backstroke outdoors, and in the 220 yd backstroke indoors. The same year she was runner-up for the James E. Sullivan Award.

In 1972 Jensen lived near Chicago, and began competing in masters swimming. Between 1972 and 1979 she won 42 national titles and set eight national or world records in the backstroke. She semi-retired in 1980 for health reasons, but resumed competing in 1997, winning her national titles in the 50, 100, and 200 m backstroke.

References

1929 births
2018 deaths
American female backstroke swimmers
Olympic swimmers of the United States
Swimmers from San Francisco
Swimmers at the 1948 Summer Olympics
21st-century American women